Margaret Gayen (born 10 July 1994) is an Australian long jumper.

In her main event she finished sixth at the 2014 Commonwealth Games and eighth at the 2014 Continental Cup. She also competed at the 2012 World Junior Championships without reaching the final.

In the 4 × 100 metres relay she finished fifth at the 2014 Commonwealth Games. She also competed at the 2014 World Relays without reaching the final.

Her personal best jump is 6.62 metres, achieved in January 2014 in Adelaide.

References

1994 births
Living people
Australian female long jumpers
Athletes (track and field) at the 2014 Commonwealth Games
Commonwealth Games competitors for Australia
21st-century Australian women